The discography of Ryan Leslie, an American hip hop and R&B record producer, singer-songwriter, multi-instrumentalist and occasional rapper, consists of three studio albums, nine singles (including four as a featured artist) and twelve music videos.

Studio albums

Miscellaneous

EPs

Singles

As lead artist

As featured artist

Guest appearances

Music videos

As main artist

As featured artist

Selected production credits 

"It Wuz U" by Anaya
"Hold Tight by Latif featuring Sonny Carson
"Hold Me Now" by Mia Rose
"Hot Boy" by Mia Rose
"Choose Us" by Nelson
"Really Didn't Matter" by Nina Sky
"Would U Love Me" By Uness
"Be Next To Ya" by Krys Ivory
"Choreographer" by Rhea featuring Jadakiss
"Harlem Boy" by Lil Eddie
"Stunt" by Game

References

External links
 
 
 

Discographies of American artists
Hip hop discographies
Rhythm and blues discographies